The 2022–23 season is the 139th season in the existence of Coventry City Football Club and the club's third consecutive season in the Championship. In addition to the league, they will also compete in the 2022–23 FA Cup and the 2022–23 EFL Cup.

Pre-season and friendlies
The Sky Blues announced their first two pre-season fixtures on May 24, with a trips to Walsall and Leamington added to the schedule. A third against Oxford United was confirmed on 31 May. Another away pre-season trip was added to the schedule on June 8, against Portsmouth. A training camp in Spain, along with a friendly against Nottingham Forest, was also added to the schedule on June 27. They had an additional mid-season tour to Spain in November 2022, during the break for the 2022 FIFA World Cup.

Competitions

Overall record

Championship

League table

Results summary

Results by round

Matches

On 23 June, the league fixtures were announced.

FA Cup

The Sky Blues entered the FA Cup in the third round and were drawn at home to Wrexham.

EFL Cup

Coventry City were drawn at home to Bristol City in the first round. Due to an unplayable pitch at Coventry Building Society Arena the match was moved to Burton Albion's Pirelli Stadium.

Squad information

Squad details

* Player age and appearances/goals for the club as of beginning of 2022–23 season.

Appearances
Correct as of match played on 18 March 2023

Goalscorers
Correct as of match played on 18 March 2023

Assists
Correct as of match played on 18 March 2023

Yellow cards
Correct as of match played on 18 March 2023

Red cards
Correct as of match played on 11 February 2023

Captains
Correct as of match played on 18 March 2023

Penalties awarded

Suspensions served

International appearances

Monthly & weekly awards

Transfers

Transfers in

Loans in

Loans out

Transfers out

References

Coventry City
Coventry City F.C. seasons
English football clubs 2022–23 season